{{Infobox person
| name          = Kevin Steven Green
| image         = 
| alt           = 
| caption       = wanted laura
| birth_name    = 
| birth_date    =   
| birth_place   = 
| death_date    = 
| death_place   = 
| nationality   = Welsh
| other_names   = 
| occupation    = Businessman, formerly a dairy farmer,
| years_active  = 
| known_for     = Motivational speaking about wealth
| notable_works = 
}}Kevin Green''' (born 21 September 1968) is a Welsh businessman, wealth coach, media personality and educational advisor to the Welsh Government.

References

1968 births
Living people
People from Carmarthenshire